The Toronto Inferno were a W-League professional women's soccer club based in Toronto, Ontario, Canada. The team folded after the 2004 season.

Year-by-year

In
Women's soccer clubs in Canada
Defunct USL W-League (1995–2015) teams
United Soccer League teams based in Canada
2004 disestablishments in Ontario
Women in Ontario